Hibiscus coulteri, the desert rosemallow, is a species of flowering plant in the family Malvaceae. It is native to steep slopes and canyon walls in the eastern Sonoran Desert, and the Chihuahuan Desert of the southwestern US and northern Mexico. A short-lived perennial shrub reaching , it is recommended for xeriscaping.

References

coulteri
Flora of Arizona
Flora of the South-Central United States
Flora of Northwestern Mexico
Flora of Northeastern Mexico
Plants described in 1852